The 2011–12 UC Irvine Anteaters men's basketball team represented the University of California, Irvine during the 2011–12 NCAA Division I men's basketball season. The Anteaters, led by second year head coach Russell Turner, played their home games at the Bren Events Center and were members of the Big West Conference. They finished the season 12–20, 6–10 in Big West play to finish tied for sixth place.

Off-Season

2011 Recruiting Class

Roster

Schedule
Sources:

|-
!colspan=9 style=| Regular season

|-
!colspan=9 style=| Big West tournament

References

UC Irvine
UC Irvine Anteaters men's basketball seasons
UC Irvine Anteaters
UC Irvine Anteaters